This is a list of post-nominal letters used in Negeri Sembilan. The order in which they follow an individual's name is the same as the order of precedence for the wearing of order insignias, decorations, and medals. When applicable, non-hereditary titles are indicated.

See also 
 Orders, decorations, and medals of Negeri Sembilan
 Order of precedence in Negeri Sembilan

References 

Post
N